is a railway station in the city of Nihonmatsu, Fukushima, Japan, operated by East Japan Railway Company (JR East).

Lines

Station layout
The station has two opposed side platforms connected to the station building by a footbridge. The station has a "Midori no Madoguchi" staffed ticket office.

Platforms

History
Nihonmatsu Station opened on December 15, 1887. The present station building was completed in September 1976. The station was absorbed into the JR East network upon the privatization of the Japanese National Railways (JNR) on April 1, 1987.

Passenger statistics
In fiscal 2018, the station was used by an average of 1,762 passengers daily (boarding passengers only).

Surrounding area

See also
 List of Railway Stations in Japan

References

External links

 

Stations of East Japan Railway Company
Railway stations in Fukushima Prefecture
Tōhoku Main Line
Railway stations in Japan opened in 1887
Nihonmatsu, Fukushima